This is a timeline documenting the events of heavy metal in the year 1976.

Newly formed bands 
 Accept
 Angel Witch
Black Flag 
 Bronz
Chrome
Citron
Crys 
 Diamond Head
 Ethel the Frog
Foreigner 
The Godz
 Heavy Load
 Kick Axe
 Līvi
 Marseille
McCoy
 Mentors
 The Obsessed
Paice Ashton Lord
Pat Travers
 Ratt
 Rose Tattoo
 Running Wild
 Sorcery
 Spider
 Sister
 Thor
 Vow Wow
 Zoetrope

Albums

March

April

May

June

August

September

October

November

December

Release date unknown 
Black Sabbath - We Sold Our Soul For Rock N Roll
Y&T - Yesterday & Today

Disbandments 
 Deep Purple (reformed in 1984)
 Sammy Hagar leaves Montrose to go solo.

Events 
 Guitarist "Fast" Eddie Clarke joins Motörhead and Larry Wallis leaves after a month.
 Deep Purple's guitarist Tommy Bolin dies from an overdose on December 4 during the Private Eyes tour, just after his last show on stage.

References 

1970s in heavy metal music
Metal